Der Gegner (The Opponent) was a German arts magazine published between April 1919 – 27 September 1922. It was edited by Julian Gumperz, and Karl Otten. It was published in Halle by Franz Joest Verlag. Wieland Herzfelde replaced Otten on the editorial board in 1920.

Featured writers
 Raoul Hausmann
 Ludwig Rubiner
 Thea Schnittke
 Hermann Schüller
 Karl August Wittfogel

Issues

References

External links
 Der Gegner 1919-1922

German Expressionism
Defunct magazines published in Germany
Visual arts magazines published in Germany
Mass media in Halle (Saale)